Chickpea distortion mosaic virus is a plant pathogenic virus of the family Potyviridae.

External links
ICTVdB - The Universal Virus Database: Chickpea distortion mosaic virus
Family Groups - The Baltimore Method

Viral plant pathogens and diseases
Potyviruses